Muhammad Ramzan was a Muslim scholar, wali and preacher.

Ramzan worked to persuade recent converts to Islam from Hinduism to abandon Hindu customs and religious festivals and to follow Muslim ones instead.

Ramzan told converted Rajputs, Meo and Jats (Muslim Rajputs) were in no way different from their Hindu counterparts in culture, customs and celebrations of religious festivals. He also said that they were not only pir-parast (Guru-worshippers) and grave worshipers (Qabr-parast); they were also idolators They celebrated Holi, Diwali and other Hindu festivals with zeal and dressed in the Hindu fashion.

Early life and death 
Ramzan was born in Meham District Rohtak (Haryana) Punjab in 1769. His father Shah Abdul Azeem 
( d 1828 Meham ) was Majzoob ( مجذوب )Sufi. His grand father Shah Abdul Hakeem (1709- 1773) was a notable Urdu writer of his time.

Ramzan was dissatisfied with the Sufi religious system under his father, whose Rajput devotees present him with a tithe from every thing taken in their raids. At age 14, Ramzan he left his family to study with Shah Abdul Qadir and Shah Abdul Aziz Delhivi the sons of Shah Waliullah. There he studied for fourteen years (1783-1796). He has worked as a preacher and tablighi throughout his life.

Ramzan was killed by Bohras at Mandsaur in Madhya Pradesh after returning from "Hajj" on 18 January 1825.

Scholarly work 
Ramzan wrote in local language and dialects, sometime in the form of poems that could be recited and held debates with the scholars of other religious.
AQAID E AZEEM عقاہدء عظیم
BULBUL BAGH E NABI ( Poetry ) بلبل باغ نبی
AKHIR GUTT آخر گت 
Rangeeli ( Poetry )
Waseet Nama 
Translation Qaseeda Amali
Adab Chokra ( children education )
Bohri Biaz 
Fatawa e Muhammadi 
Barq Laamaa Risala 
Alim o Frayz Risala Ramzani
Radd e Rawafiz Risala ( Persian )
His famous books "AQAID E AZEEM","BULBUL BAGH E NABI" And"AKHIR GUTT" are available on" Haryanvi Siddiqui" page Facebook.

References

Further reading 
MATAR AL AJDAD (1964) by Prof:Manzoor-ul-haq Siddiqui
Tazkira E Ulamaye Hind (November 1914) by Rehman Ali
 Urdu Ki Shakh Haryanvi Zuban Main Talifat (February 1932)by Hafiz Mehmood Sheerani
Punjab Mein Urdu by Hafiz Mehmood Khan Shirani
Tarikh E Zbane Urdu by Prof : Masoud Husain Khan
 HADI E HARYANA (October 1963) by Prof:Manzoor-ul-haq Siddiqui
Tazkira E Sufiya E Mewat by Muhammad Habib ur Rehman Khan Mewati
The Legacy of Muslim Rule in India by K.S. Lal
TIME FOR STOCK TAKING ( The Tabligh Movement or Millionsof Bearded Militants on the March )by Sita Ram Goel
Family Tree ( خاندانی شجرہ ) Compiled by Shafa Ullah Siddiqui

1769 births
1825 deaths